Etlingera sessilanthera is a monocotyledonous plant species described by Rosemary Margaret Smith. Etlingera sessilanthera is part of the genus Etlingera and the family Zingiberaceae. No subspecies are listed in the Catalog of Life.

References 

sessilanthera
Taxa named by Rosemary Margaret Smith